Vaidyanathan or Vaithianathan is a Tamil male given name. Due to the Tamil tradition of using patronymic surnames it may also be a surname for males and females.

Notable people

Given name
 Kanthiah Vaithianathan (1896–1965), Ceylonese civil servant
 Kunnakudi Vaidyanathan (1935–2008), Indian classical music violinist
 L. Vaidyanathan (1942–2007), Indian musicologist
 L. V. Vaidyanathan (1928–2000), Indian soil scientist
 M. Vaithianathan, Indian politician
 P. P. Vaidyanathan (born 1954), Indian academic
 S. R. D. Vaidyanathan (1929–2013), Indian musician
 Sunil Vaidyanathan (born 1976), Indian author
 Tiruvarur Vaidyanathan (born 1963), Indian mridangam artist
 V. Vaidyanathan (born 1968), Indian businessman

Surname
 Ameya Vaidyanathan (born 1996), Indian racing driver
 Ananth Vaidyanathan (born 1957), Indian singing trainer
 Anu Vaidyanathan (born 1983/4), Indian triathlete
 Arun Vaidyanathan, Indian-American film director
 Ganesh Vaidyanathan, American academic
 Nirupama Vaidyanathan (born 1976), Indian tennis player
 Rama Vaidyanathan, Indian bharatnatyam artist
 Rhema Vaithianathan, New Zealand academic
 Saroja Vaidyanathan (born 1937), Indian choreographer
 Suresh Vaidyanathan (born 1966), Indian performing artist
 Vaithianathan Navaratnam (1909–2006), Ceylonese politician
 Vaidyanathan Thirunavukkarasu (1926–2008), Singaporean journalist
 Vaithianathan Venkatasubramanian, American academic
 Vasantha Vaidyanathan (1937–2018), Sri Lankan broadcaster
 Vinodhini Vaidyanathan (born 1981), Indian actress

See also
 Vaidyanathapura
 
 



Tamil masculine given names